Abu Salim 'Abd Allah ibn Mohammed ibn Abu Bakr al-'Ayyashi (May 4, 1628December 13 or 18, 1679) was a well-known travel writer, poet, lawyer, and Sufi scholar from Morocco.

Biography 
Abu Salim al-'Ayyashi was born on 4 May 1628 in the Berber tribe of ait Ayyash living in the Middle Moroccan Atlas. His father was the head of a zawiyya. Al-Ayyashi lived and studied in Fez and joined the Sufi order of the Nasiriyya in Tamegroute. He travelled three times to the Hejaz in 1649, 1653 and 1661 and stayed for long periods in Mecca, Medina, Jerusalem and Cairo.

Works 
He wrote a two volume rihla about his journeys: Ma’ al-Mawa’id (Table Water). Al-'Ayyashi is, moreover, the author of several further works:
 Manẓuma fi ’l-Buyuʻ, a treatise in verse on sales, with a commentary; 
 Tanbīh Dhawī al-Himam ’l-ʻAlīya ʻala al-Zuhd fī ’l-Dunyā al-Fānīya, treatise on Sufism; 
 a study on the particle law, 
 al-Ḥukm bi-’l-ʻadl wa-al-inṣāf ’l-Dāfiʻ li ’l-khilāf fī-mā waqaʻa bayn baʻḍ Fuqahāʼ Sijlimāsa min al-ikhtilāf 
 Iqtifa’ al-Athar ba’d Dhahab Ahl al-Athar, biographical collection; 
 Tuḥfat (Itḥāf) al-akhillāʼ bi-ijāzāt al-mashāyikh al-ajillāʼ, biographies of his masters (these last two works probably forming his Fahrasa).

References

Further reading
Abu Salim Abd Allah ibn Muhammad Ayyashi, Iqtifa al-athar bada dhihab ahl al-athar: Fihris Abi Salim al-Ayyashi, 11 H/17 M (Manshurat Kulliyat al-Adab wa-al-Ulum al-Insaniyah bi-al-Rabat. Silsilat Rasail wa-utruhat), ed. 1996 by al-Mamlakah al-Maghribiyah, Jamiat Muhammad al-Khamis, Kulliyat al-Adab wa-al-Ulum al-Insaniyah bi-al-Rabat, 
Arrihla Al Ayachiia, Abou Salim Abdellah Ben Mohamed El Ayachi. Vol. 2. Edition révisé par Saïd El Fadhili et Solaiman El Korachi. Dar Essouaidi Linachr Wa Attawzie, Abou Dabie, EAU. 2006.

1628 births
1679 deaths

Moroccan travel writers
17th-century Moroccan poets
Moroccan scholars
17th-century Moroccan people
People from Tafilalt
People from Fez, Morocco

17th-century Berber people
Berber writers
Berber poets
Moroccan Sufis